"World" is a song by the Bee Gees, released in 1967 as a single in the United Kingdom and Europe and then included on their album Horizontal the following year. Though it was a big hit in Europe, Atco Records did not issue it as a single in the United States, having just issued a third single from Bee Gees' 1st, "Holiday".

Recording and composition
The song's first recording session was on 3 October 1967 along with "With the Sun in My Eyes" and "Words". The song's last recording session was on 28 October 1967. "World" was originally planned as having no orchestra, so was recorded on four tracks, including some piano played by Maurice and organ played by Robin. When it was decided to add an orchestra, the four tracks containing the band were mixed to one track and the orchestra was added to the other track. The stereo mix suffered since the second tape had to play as mono until the end when the orchestra comes in on one side. Barry adds: "'World' is one of those things we came up with in the studio, Everyone just having fun and saying, 'Let's just do something!' you know". Vince Melouney recalls: "I had this idea to play the melody right up in the top register of the guitar behind the chorus". The song's lyrics question the singer's purpose in life.

Release
In 1990, Bill Inglot synched up the two tape reels and made a new stereo mix for the Tales from the Brothers Gibb box set. Two mixes of the record were played to journalists at a press conference before its release. The released version is mainly the unorchestrated version but the orchestrated version is used from 2:39. The track features Robin on organ and Maurice on double-tracked piano. The vocals are mostly by Barry but Robin sings the chorus a few times prior to the fadeout.

Allmusic's Donald A. Guarisco described this song as "a thoroughly psychedelic ballad worthy of the Moody Blues' finest similar efforts". The original promotional video for "World" is black and white.

Personnel
 Barry Gibb – lead vocals, rhythm guitar
 Robin Gibb – Hammond organ, lead vocals on closing choruses 
 Maurice Gibb – bass, piano
 Vince Melouney – lead guitar
 Colin Petersen – drums
 Bill Shepherd – orchestral arrangement

Chart performance

Peak positions

Year-end charts

References

 

Bee Gees songs
1967 songs
1967 singles
Number-one singles in Germany
Songs written by Barry Gibb
Songs written by Maurice Gibb
Songs written by Robin Gibb
Song recordings produced by Robert Stigwood
Polydor Records singles
Pop ballads